Ali Hama Saleh Taha (Kurdish: عەلی حەمە ساڵح تەها, romanised: Elî Heme Saleh Teha, born 16 April 1984) is an Iraqi Kurdish politician, He was a member of the Kurdistan Region parliament. 

Although he is not an expert in finance or mathematics, Ali has gained the nickname of "The Calculator" for asking questions about government finances with a specific focus on corruption.

Additionally, he is regarded as being the most active and reputable MP in this round (5th term) of the Kurdistan Parliament.

References

External links
 Xebercom

1984 births
Living people
Iraqi Kurdistani politicians
Gorran Movement politicians
Members of the Kurdistan Region Parliament
People from Erbil